Moydrum is a townland near Athlone, County Westmeath, Ireland. The townland is in the civil parishs of St. Mary's and Ballyloughloe (Clonlonan).

The townland stands to the east of the town. The Athlone to Mullingar Cycleway cuts through the centre of the area. The townland is bordered by Blyry Lower, Blyry Upper, Creggan Lower, and Garrycastle to the west, Annaghgortagh and Tullycross to the north, Crosswood and Creggan Upper to the south and Carn Park to the east.

Moydrum also lends its name to an Electoral Division which covers the area to the north of Athlone.

Moydrum Castle 

Moydrum Castle (Irish: Caisleán Maigh Droma meaning "plain of the ridge"), a 19th Century castle is located in the east of the townland.

References 

Townlands of County Westmeath